The Tipton Times is a weekly newspaper serving the city of Tipton, Missouri and Moniteau County. It was founded in 1877 by Abel Marcy. 

Marcy's sons and widow maintained the paper after his death in July, 1884 and sold the paper to Walt M. Monroe in November, 1885.

As of 2018, the paper's circulation was 6700.

Vernon Publishing currently owns and prints The Tipton Times, along with 6 other mid-Missouri papers. Originally, started by newspaper printer Wallace G. Vernon, Vernon Publishing has lasted three generations of printing weekly papers in mid-Missouri.

References

Newspapers published in Missouri